Greg Lane (born 29 April 1960) is  a former Australian rules footballer who played with St Kilda in the Victorian Football League (VFL).

Notes

External links 
		

Living people
1960 births
Australian rules footballers from Victoria (Australia)
St Kilda Football Club players